A transport accident is any accident (or incident) that occurs during any type of transportation, including accidents occurring during road transport, rail transport, marine transport and air transport.   It can refer to: 

a road traffic accident (including vehicle collision, pedestrian–bicycle collisions, pedestrian–pedestrian collisions etc.）
a marine accident (sailing ship accident, including man overboard)
railroad accidents (including train wreck)
an aviation accident and incident

Comparisons　
There are three main ways in which risk of fatality of a certain mode of travel can be measured:
Deaths per billion typical journeys taken, deaths per billion hours traveled, or deaths per billion kilometers traveled. The following table displays these statistics for the United Kingdom 1990–2000. Note that aviation safety does not include the transportation to the airport.

See also
:Category:Lists of motor vehicle deaths by year
Road traffic safety
Automotive safety
Motorcycle safety
Bicycle safety
:Category:Lists of railway accidents and incidents
:Category:Railway safety
Marine accident investigation
:Category:Maritime safety
Aviation safety

References 

Transport safety
Accidents